Charles M. Wysocki, Jr. (November 16, 1928 – July 29, 2002) was an American painter, whose primitive artworks depict a stylized version of American life of yesteryear. While some of his works show horseless carriages, most depict the horse and buggy era. Wysocki released his paintings in popular art prints and merchandised with calendars, collector plates, tins, greeting cards, wallpaper and jigsaw puzzles.

Biography

Charles M. Wysocki, Jr., was born in Detroit, Michigan, the son of Charles M. Wysocki and Mary K. Wysocki. His father was born in Poland, while his mother was born in Kansas to Polish-born parents.

At Cass Technical High School in Detroit he studied art. In 1950 while working in local art studios, he was drafted into the Army and spent his two-year hitch in West Germany. After his service he went to the Art Center School in Los Angeles under the G.I. Bill, where he studied to be a commercial illustrator. After working in that field in Detroit for four years, he returned to Los Angeles where he helped to form a freelance advertising agency.

In 1960, he met Elizabeth G. Lawrence, an art graduate of UCLA, whom he married on July 29 of that year in Los Angeles. Through his wife, whose family were early settlers in the San Fernando Valley, Wysocki came to appreciate a simpler, more rural life than that of the big city. Together they made many trips to New England, which served to nurture his interest in early American folk art. For a while, he continued his lucrative commercial art work while developing primitive art in his spare time. Eventually, though, he devoted all of his attention to this new interest. His focus was on Americana landscapes of old New England, with antiques, fall colors, snow scenes and picturesque barns. Also popular were a few works featuring cats, such as sleeping cats populating a bookshelf. In the 1990s Wysocki had an art gallery in Lake Arrowhead.  His work was marketed and licensed by AMCAL, Inc. and for a time by the Greenwich Workshop, Ltd.

By the 1980s, his products were reaping more than $7 million in annual sales and was said to have sold more than $10 million jigsaw puzzles over a decade. He was featured in the July 7, 1986 edition of People magazine. In an interview, Wysocki said  "I like the fact that I appeal to the average guy...I feel so fortunate." 

Wysocki was a favorite artist of Ronald Reagan. As California governor, he hung one of Wysocki’s New England paintings in his office. After Reagan became President, Wysocki was extended an invitation to the 1981 White House Independence Day celebration. At that time, his painting The White House Fourth of July Picnic, became part of the presidential art collection.  In 1991 the Richard Nixon Library exhibited Wysocki’s works which drew thousands of visitors. 

Two books featuring Wysocki's works were published: An American Celebration (1985) and Heartland (1994).  Although these met with much success, Publishers Weekly dubbed him a faux naïve artist.

Wysocki made his home in Joshua Tree, California, painting up until his death in 2002 at the age of 73, following abdominal surgery complications. He died on his forty-second wedding anniversary, surrounded by his family. Wysocki was survived by his wife, three children and two grandchildren. 

Currently, Wysocki art prints continue to sell though galleries and alongside home decor through Wayfair. His original oil paintings sell between $1,000 and $60,000 when they come up at auction. In 2020 Olde Bucks County fetched $60,000, exceeding Christie's pre-auction estimate of $10,000 to $20,000.

References

External links
 Charles Wysocki Gallery
 

1928 births
2002 deaths
20th-century American painters
20th-century American male artists
American male painters
21st-century American painters
Cass Technical High School alumni
Naïve painters
People from Joshua Tree, California
American people of Polish descent